A toast sandwich is a sandwich in which the filling between two slices of bread is itself a thin slice of toasted bread, which may be buttered. An 1861 recipe says to add salt and pepper to taste.

Victorian recipe
A recipe for toast sandwiches is included in the invalid cookery section of the 1861 Book of Household Management by Isabella Beeton, who adds, "This sandwich may be varied by adding a little pulled meat, or very fine slices of cold meat, to the toast, and in any of these forms will be found very tempting to the appetite of an invalid."

Modern versions
In November 2011, the toast sandwich was recreated by the Royal Society of Chemistry in a tasting 150 years after the release of Beeton's Book of Household Management. They named it "the country's most economical lunch", offering  to whoever could create a cheaper edible meal. Due to an overabundance of submissions, the offer was closed seven days later and the £200 given to a randomly selected entrant.

In Heston Blumenthal's restaurant the Fat Duck, 12 toast sandwiches are served as a side dish to the "Mad Hatter's Tea Party (circa 1892)", a main course inspired by Alice in Wonderland. Blumenthal's recipe for the toast sandwich involves bone marrow salad, egg yolk, mustard, gastrique, mayonnaise, and tomato ketchup.

United States media coverage
The A.V. Club Mike Vago described it as an "extravagance of blandness". The Daily Meal article "12 Life-Changing Sandwiches You've Never Heard Of" said the toast sandwich was "just not that good ... Thankfully, the Dadaists didn't invent any more sandwiches after that."

The toast sandwich was discussed on The Leonard Lopate Show in an interview with The Sporkfuls Dan Pashman. Host Leonard Lopate commented, "it sounds weird to me". The game show panelists on NPR's Wait Wait... Don't Tell Me! each tried the toast sandwich. Host Peter Sagal remarked, "This is the culinary equivalent of a Rothko painting. Or it's like a sandwich by Marcel Duchamp! It questions the essence of sandwich and language both!"

See also

 List of bread dishes
 List of sandwiches
 List of toast dishes

References

External links
 

Toast dishes
British sandwiches